Reilly Opelka was the defending champion, but withdrew from the event.

Hubert Hurkacz won the title, defeating Sebastian Korda in the final, 6–3, 6–3. Hurkacz did not face an opponent ranked inside the top 100 during his title run.

Seeds
The top four seeds receive a bye into the second round.

Draw

Finals

Top half

Bottom half

Qualifying

Seeds

Qualifiers

Qualifying draw

First qualifier

Second qualifier

Third qualifier

Fourth qualifier

References

External links
 Main draw
 Qualifying draw

2021 ATP Tour
2021 Singles
2021 in sports in Florida
2021 in American tennis